J. D. Gravina is an American college basketball coach and the coach of the Western Illinois women's basketball team.

Head coaching record

References

Living people
Year of birth missing (living people)
Western Illinois Leathernecks women's basketball coaches
Emporia State University alumni